Beinn Resipol (845 m) is a mountain of the Northwest Highlands, Scotland, in the Ardnamurchan area of Lochaber.

The mountain is the most western of Scotland's large peaks. It lies between Loch Sunart and Loch Shiel.

References

Mountains and hills of the Northwest Highlands
Marilyns of Scotland
Corbetts